Talal bin Abdullah  (26 February 1909 – 7 July 1972) was King of Jordan from the assassination of his father, King Abdullah I, on 20 July 1951 until his forced abdication on 11 August 1952. As a member of the Hashemite dynasty, the royal family of Jordan since 1921, Talal was a 39th-generation direct descendant of Muhammad.

Talal was born in Mecca as the eldest child of Abdullah bin Hussein and his wife Musbah bint Nasser. Abdullah was a son of Hussein bin Ali, Sharif of Mecca, who led the Great Arab Revolt during World War I against the Ottoman Empire in 1916. After removing Ottoman rule, Abdullah established the Emirate of Transjordan in 1921, which became a British Protectorate, and ruled as its Emir. During Abdullah's absence, Talal spent his early years alone with his mother. Talal received private education in Amman, later joining Transjordan's Arab Legion as second lieutenant in 1927. He then became aide to his grandfather Sharif Hussein, the ousted king of the Hejaz, during his exile in Cyprus. By 1948, Talal became a general in the Arab Legion.

Abdullah sought independence in 1946, and the Emirate became the Hashemite Kingdom of Jordan. Talal became crown prince upon his father's designation as king of Jordan. Abdullah was assassinated in Jerusalem in 1951, and Talal became king. Talal's most revered achievement as king is the establishment of Jordan's modern constitution in 1952, rendering his kingdom a constitutional monarchy. He ruled for less than thirteen months until he was forced to abdicate by Parliament because he was experiencing a mental illness, reported as schizophrenia. Talal spent the rest of his life at a sanatorium in Istanbul and died there on 7 July 1972. He was succeeded by his oldest son Hussein.

Early life
He was born in Mecca as the eldest child of Abdullah, an Arab deputy of Mecca in the Ottoman Parliament, and his wife Musbah bint Nasser. Abdullah was the son of Hussein bin Ali, Sharif of Mecca, traditional steward of the holy cities of Mecca and Medina. Sharif Hussein and his sons led the Great Arab Revolt against the Ottoman Empire in 1916; after removing Ottoman rule, the Sharif's sons established Arab monarchies in place. Abdullah established the Emirate of Transjordan in 1921, a British Protectorate, for which he was Emir. During Abdullah's absence, Talal spent his early years alone with his mother. Talal received private education in Amman, later joining Transjordan's Arab Legion as second lieutenant in 1927. He then became aide to his grandfather Sharif Hussein, the ousted King of the Hejaz, during his exile in Cyprus. By 1948, Talal became a general in the Army.

He was educated privately before attending the British Army's Royal Military College, Sandhurst, from which he graduated in 1929 when he was commissioned as a second lieutenant in the Cavalry Regiment of the Arab Legion.  His regiment was attached to a British regiment in Jerusalem and also to the Royal Artillery in Baghdad.

Reign

 
Talal ascended the Jordanian throne after the assassination of his father, Abdullah I, in Jerusalem.  His son Hussein, who was accompanying his grandfather at Friday prayers, was also nearly a victim. On 20 July 1951, Prince Hussein travelled to Jerusalem to perform Friday prayers at the Al-Aqsa Mosque with his grandfather, King Abdullah I. An assassin, fearing that the king might normalise relations with the State of Israel, killed Abdullah, but the 15-year-old Hussein survived.

During his short reign he was responsible for the formation of a liberalised constitution for the Hashemite Kingdom of Jordan, which made the government collectively, and the ministers individually, responsible before the Jordanian Parliament. The constitution was ratified on 1 January 1952.  King Talal is also judged as having done much to smooth the previously strained relations between Jordan and the neighbouring Arab states of Egypt and Saudi Arabia.

Talal has been described by his cousin Prince Ra'ad bin Zeid in a 2002 interview as having "very anti-British sentiments", caused by Britain's failure to fully comply with their agreement with his grandfather Sharif Hussein ibn Ali in the McMahon–Hussein Correspondence to establish an independent Arab kingdom under his rule. Talal was described by British resident in Transjordan Sir Alec Kirkbride in a 1939 correspondence as being "at heart, deeply anti-British". However, Kirkbride doubted the meaningfulness of this animosity towards the British, owing it purely to the "tension" between Talal and his father Emir Abdullah and Talal's desire to create of himself as a "big nuisance as possible".

Israeli historian Avi Shlaim, however, argues that Talal's contempt for the British was genuine as he "bitterly resented British affairs in the affairs of his country" and that such hostility towards the British was downplayed by Kirkbride due to Britain's "self-serving" interests to "protect her reputation". Furthermore, at the time of the succession crisis that occurred after King Abdullah I's assassination, Talal was described by contemporary Egyptian and Syrian press as a "great patriotic anti- imperialist" in contrast to his half-brother Naif, who also sought the throne, and was denounced as "weak- minded and entirely subservient to British influence".

Forced abdication and death
A year into Talal's reign, Arab Legion intelligence officer Major Hutson reported that Amman was "seething with a rumor to the effect that the Legion, or Cabinet, intend on handing over West Jordan to Israel and that King Talal was deported by the British for refusing to agree".

At this time, Talal was reported by British resident Furlonge, Queen Zein (mother of Talal's son and successor Hussein), and Prime Minister Tawfik Abu Al-Huda as experiencing a mental illness. Furlonge particularly suggested that Talal be "forced out of Amman" and "forced into a French clinic". Talal was subsequently flown in a civil (not royal) RAF plane to Paris for "treatment".

Talal's reportedly unwell medical condition is highlighted by an incident on 29 May 1952 when Queen Zein (described by British historian Nigel J. Ashton as "a sophisticated political operator with her own private communication channels with the British") sought refuge in the British embassy in Paris, claiming that Talal "threatened her with a knife and attempted to kill one of his younger children". Prime Minister Tawfik Abu al-Huda consequently attempted to induce Talal into abdicating; however, he was harshly reproached by Talal, who said he "had no intentions of abdicating". Furthermore, PM Abu al-Huda received reports that Talal was attempting to challenge the government with the help of "private individuals" and an "officer in the Arab Legion".

This led Abu al-Huda into summoning both houses of parliament to an "extraordinary session", requesting their approval of a motion dictating that Talal be deposed for "medical reasons", specifically "schizophrenia". Abu al-Huda backed up his requests with medical reports and argued that Talal's medical condition was irrevocable, and Talal's deposition was unanimously accepted by parliament later that day.

Nationalist officers in the Army suspected that the parliamentary session to discuss Talal's abdication was a plot against him. They asked the King's aide-de-camp, 'Abd Al'Aziz Asfur, to arrange a meeting with him to arrange a response to the supposed plot. However, Asfur returned to the officers and confirmed the claims about his mental condition.

Abu al-Huda proceeded to rule Jordan, from the day of Talal's deposition on 11 August 1952 until Talal's son Hussein came of age on 2 May 1953, in a "dictatorial" fashion. He was described by Glubb Pasha as a "Prime Minister dictator" who had ruled "stably" as Emir Abdullah I had done. Glubb Pasha particularly commended this as he noted that Arab countries were presently "unfit for full democracy on the British model". Abu al-Huda's ascension was supported by Political Resident Furlonge as Abu al-Huda was from the "old guard" and thus "accustomed to the existing system and relationship with Britain".

Contrary to his wish to live in Saudi-ruled Hejaz after his abdication, Talal was sent to live the latter part of his life at a sanatorium in Istanbul and died there on 7 July 1972. Talal was buried in the Royal Mausoleum at the Raghadan Palace in Amman.
__gallery__

Legacy
Despite his short reign, he is revered for having established a modern constitution of Jordan.

Personal life

In 1934, Talal married his first cousin Zein al-Sharaf who bore him four sons and two daughters:
King Hussein (14 November 1935 – 7 February 1999).
Princess Asma, died at birth in 1937.
Prince Muhammad (2 October 1940 – 29 April 2021).
Prince Hassan (born 20 March 1947).
Prince Muhsin, deceased.
Princess Basma (born 11 May 1951).

Ancestry

See also

 Hashemites
 List of kings of Jordan
 King Abdullah I
 King Hussein

References

Bibliography
 

1909 births
1972 deaths
People from Mecca
Monarchs who abdicated
Field marshals
House of Hashim
Kings of Jordan
People with schizophrenia
Graduates of the Royal Military College, Sandhurst
Muslim monarchs
Royalty and nobility with disabilities
Sons of kings
20th-century Jordanian people